Czech Crown (Monarchist Party of Bohemia, Moravia and Silesia) (KČ) is a Czech monarchist political party that strives for the restoration of Czech monarchy with the House of Habsburg-Lorraine. The party was founded in 1990 and its current leader is Radim Špaček. In the 2017 Czech legislative election Koruna Česká ran in a coalition with TOP 09 and received 5.35% of the votes. In the 2019 European Parliament election it ran together with KDU-ČSL and received 7.24% of the votes.

History

Political movement 
Koruna Česká is one of the oldest active political parties in the Czech Republic founded after the end of the Communist regime in Czechoslovakia. Its precursor was a monarchist civic initiative České děti ("Czech Children") founded in 1988 by Petr Placák as a dissident group against the communist regime. They published a samizdat magazine called Koruna.

Koruna Česká as a political movement was founded on 25 November 1990 in Švanda Theatre in Prague, officially named Czech Crown (Royalist Movement of Bohemia, Moravia and Silesia). Dalibor Stejskal was elected as its first leader. On 14 December 1991 the first General Assembly of Koruna Česká convened. In 1993 KČ formed a political partnership with the Christian Democratic Party of Václav Benda and in the following years they closely cooperated, until the latter merged into the Civic Democratic Party in 1996.

The second leader of KČ was Dalibor Pták (1997–1999) and the third one was Milan Schelinger (1999–2003), a musician and brother of a famous Czech rock Singer Jiří Schelinger. In 2003 KČ was transformed from a political movement into a political party.

Political party 
In May 2003 Schelinger resigned as the leader of the party and in November 2003 Václav Srb, who had been the party's hejtman of Bohemia was elected as the new leader. Since 2004 the party actively contested in every elections. In 2006 Czech municipal elections they gained first local councillors and mayors.

While in the early years, the official position of KČ was that they have no authority to decide who would be the new Czech king, in 2007 KČ clarified its monarchist position as legitimism (actively supporting the claim of the House of Habsburg-Lorraine as descendants of Charles I of Austria, the last King of Bohemia).

In 2011 KČ suffered an internal crisis when a "conservative platform" was formed, critical of the policy of the party and striving to shift its political position more in a national conservative direction. The conservative platform tried to take over the party, but it was defeated during the XX General Assembly in November 2011. Many of its members then left the party and founded a conservative monarchist association called MONOS.

In 2013 Czech presidential election, the first direct presidential election in the country, KČ boycotted the election, as it was contrary to its goal of unelected head of state. At the same time, an independent monarchist candidate, sculptor Emil Adamec announced his candidacy, but he failed to gather enough signatures of citizens to become a candidate. Some members of KČ supported him, while others urged the party to support the candidacy of Karel Schwarzenberg as an aristocrat and a personal friend of the royal house. KČ remained neutral, but issued a statement that is monarchists want to participate, then Schwarzenberg is the best choice. Some KČ members also created mock ballots for Karl von Habsburg as an heir to the throne, which garnered some media attention.

In 2013 legislative election KČ competed in 11 of 14 regions. They were locally successful in Hlinná in Ústí nad Labem Region where they got 16% of votes.

In 2014 Senate election a coalition candidate of KČ and ODS Lumír Aschenbrenner was successful in Plzeň. In the XXIII General Assembly on 29 November 2014 Petr Nohel defeated Petr Krátký with 72% of the vote to become the new leader of the party.

In 2017 legislative election Koruna Česká together with Conservative Party and Club of Committed Non-Party Members agreed on joint endorsement of TOP 09, while TOP 09 added candidates of the smaller parties on their list. The TOP 09 list eventually received 5.3% of votes, winning seven seats in the parliament, none of them for KČ members.

In 2018 presidential election KČ again boycotted the election and endorsed their members to cast a fictional ballot for Karl von Habsburg. In 2018 Czech Senate election Jitka Chalánková, an independent candidate running with the support of Koruna Česká and Conservative Party was successful.

In the XXVII General Assembly in November 2018 Radim Špaček was elected as the new leader of the party.

In 2019 European Parliament election Koruna Česká together with other smaller parties made a coalition with KDU-ČSL and their list received 7.24% of the vote. After the election KČ suggested Archduke Karl von Habsburg as the next President of the European Commission and sent a formal request to the Prime Minister of the Czech Republic to support him. Since June 2019 Czech royalists have been heavily involved in the protests against Prime Minister Andrej Babiš and President Miloš Zeman as was reported by some Czech media and the International Monarchist League.

Election results

Chamber of Deputies

European Parliament

Notes

References

External links
Official website (in Czech)
Article in The Prague Post (in English)

Monarchist parties in the Czech Republic
Conservative parties in the Czech Republic
Monarchism in the Czech Republic
1990 establishments in Czechoslovakia
Political parties established in 1990
Right-wing parties in the Czech Republic